Sinungaling Mong Puso (International title: Cruel Lies / ) is a 2016 Philippine television drama suspense series broadcast by GMA Network. The series is based on a 1992 Philippine film of the same title. Directed by Ricky Davao, it stars Rhian Ramos, Rafael Rosell and Kiko Estrada. It premiered on July 18, 2016 on the network's Afternoon Prime line up replacing Hanggang Makita Kang Muli. The series concluded on October 28, 2016 with a total of 74 episodes. It was replaced by Hahamakin ang Lahat in its timeslot.

The series is streaming online on YouTube.

Premise
Clara and Roman will meet each other in a time when they are going through something. They will suddenly get along and marry each other. It is going to be a start of healing for Clara until she notices something different about Roman, who eventually turns out to be hard, skeptic and abusive. She will eventually meet a younger man, Jason who will give her the caring that she is looking for.

Cast and characters

Lead cast
 Rhian Ramos as Clara Pamintuan-Aguirre
 Rafael Rosell as Roman Labangon Aguirre
 Kiko Estrada as Jason Villafuerte Aguirre

Supporting cast
 Jazz Ocampo as Hanna Arellano-Aguirre
 Michael de Mesa as Moises Aguirre
 Glydel Mercado as Raquel Labangon-Aguirre
 Sherilyn Reyes-Tan as Liza Arellano
 Cheska Diaz as Helen Villafuerte
 JC Tiuseco as Jolo
 Gab de Leon as Vin
 Stephanie Sol as Camilla Ganzon
 Gee Canlas as Jillian

Guest cast
 Paolo Contis as Eric Salvacion
 Ryza Cenon as Leda Robles-Aguirre
 Tessbomb as Rowena "Wena"
 Kevin Sagra as Borj
 Marlann Flores as Josephine
 Karla Pambide as Lorna
 Francis Mata as Dante Ibañez
 Faith da Silva
 Nikki Co
 Beatriz Imperial
 Claire Vande as Kylie
 Ollie Espino as Larry Arellano
 Apollo Abraham
 Paolo Gamboa as Greg Villegas
 Mayen Estanero as Alma
 Afi Africa as Tony
 Wowie de Guzman as Mario Villafuerte
 Manilyn Reynes as Angelica Pamintuan
 Andrea del Rosario as Lourdes Robles
 Snooky Serna as Clara's mother 
 Emilio Garcia as Clara's father
 Maey Bautista as a prisoner

Ratings
According to AGB Nielsen Philippines' Mega Manila household television ratings, the pilot episode of Sinungaling Mong Puso earned a 13.4% rating. While the final episode scored a 15.5% rating.

Accolades

References

External links
  
 

2016 Philippine television series debuts
2016 Philippine television series endings
Filipino-language television shows
GMA Network drama series
Live action television shows based on films
Television shows set in Quezon City